Cheorwon station is a closed railway station on the Gyeongwon Line in South Korea. This station was also the starting point of the former Geumgangsan Line. 

After the partition of Korea in 1945, the station was located in North Korea, where it was operated by the Korean State Railway as part of the northern section of the Gyeongwon Line until September 1950. It was closed in 1950 due to the Korean War, but was restored and reopened as a museum in 1988.

Gallery

References

Defunct railway stations in South Korea